The New Zealander of the Year Awards, currently known as the Kiwibank New Zealander of the Year Awards, celebrate the achievements of New Zealanders and were founded in 2010 by Australian Jeffrey John Hopp. Nominations are accepted from the general public and a judging panel selects finalists in each category. The awards are presented in Auckland in March each year.

Categories 
Categories in the awards include:
 Kiwibank New Zealander of the Year Award Te Pou Whakarae o Aotearoa 
 University of Canterbury Young New Zealander of the Year Award Te Mātātahi o te Tau(nominees must be aged between 15 and 30 years of age)
 Ryman Healthcare Senior New Zealander of the Year Award Te Mātāpuputu o te Tau (nominees must be aged over 70 years of age)
 Spark New Zealand Innovator of the Year Award Te Pou Whakairo o te Tau(introduced in 2014)
Ministry for the Environment New Zealand Environmental Hero of the Year Te Toa Taiao o te Tau (Open to individuals) (introduced in 2022)
 Mitre 10 New Zealand Community of the Year Award Ngā Pou Whirinaki o te Tau
 Kiwibank New Zealand Local Hero of the Year Award Te Pou Toko o te Tau

Nominations and selection 
Any member of the public can nominate an individual (aged 15 years or older), organisation or group for an award. A judging panel of one executive judge and two or three additional judges creates a list of semi-finalists, followed by a shortlist of three finalists for each award. The finalists are invited to the New Zealander of the Year Awards Gala in Auckland and the winners are announced on the night. Local Hero Medal recipients are awarded throughout December each year.

All nominees receive a certificate of achievement, and each of the six category award winners receives a trophy and a prize of NZ$5,000.

In 2020 the executive judges were:

 Tess Casey, CEO, Neighbourhood Support NZ
 Bill Dwyer, Commercial and Corporate Lawyer
 Jamie Fitzgerald, CEO, Inspiring Performance
 Marisa Fong, Trustee, Simplicity NZ; Director, Masimaya Consulting, Founder/Director, Arné Skincare
 Abby Foote, Professional Director
 Steve Jurkovich, CEO, Kiwibank
 Miriama Kamo, Te Koruru, Patron
 Bill Moran, Professional Director, Chair, Sport New Zealand
 Mere Pohatu, Regional Director, Ministry of Maori Development
 Caren Rangi, ONZM, Deputy Chair of Creative New Zealand
 Lou Sanson, Director-General of the Department of Conservation

Recipients

Gallery

New Zealanders of the Year

Young New Zealanders of the Year

Senior New Zealanders of the Year

Innovators of the Year

Local Heroes

References

External links
New Zealander of the Year Awards official site

New Zealand awards
2009 establishments in New Zealand